Opogona comptella is a moth of the family Tineidae. It is found from southern Queensland to Tasmania as well as in New Zealand.

The wingspan is about 15 mm.

The larvae feed on the bark of Salix vitellina and the galls of Acacia dealbata (caused by the rust fungus Uromycladium tepperianum) and Acacia melanoxylon (caused by the fly Cecidomyia acaciaelongifoliae).

References

Opogona
Moths of Australia
Moths of New Zealand
Moths described in 1864